Island Saddle ( above sea level) is an alpine pass that is located in the Crimea Range in Canterbury, New Zealand. The pass is on the Rainbow Valley–Hanmer Road, commonly known as the Rainbow Road. Island Saddle is New Zealand's highest public road.

References

Mountain passes of New Zealand
Landforms of Canterbury, New Zealand
Transport in Canterbury, New Zealand